Om Namo is a book written by Shantinath Desai. Author received 2000's Sahitya Akademi Award posthumously for this work. This book translated to Hindi by Dharenendra Kurakuri and to English by G. S. Amur.
This work has his study of Jainism in Karnataka.

Om Namho tells two interrelated stories. The first of these which is a love story of two young British citizens, Adam Desai and Ann Eagleton, who come to India for a research on social anthropology. The second related to an old family belonging to Krishnapur located in the northern parts of Karnataka. This family undergoes modernization because of English exposure during India's twentieth century social changes.

References 

1999 novels
1999 Indian novels
Kannada novels
Sahitya Akademi Award-winning works